This article shows the rosters of all participating teams at the men's handball tournament at the 2015 Pan American Games in Toronto. Rosters can have a maximum of 15 athletes.

The Argentine handball men's team that will compete at the 2015 Pan American Games:

Head coach:  Eduardo Gallardo

Brazil announced their squad on June 1, 2015.

Head coach:  Jordi Ribera

Canada announced their squad on June 26, 2015.

The Chile handball men's team that will compete at the 2015 Pan American Games:

Head coach:  Fernando Capurro

The Cuba handball men's team that will compete at the 2015 Pan American Games:

Head coach:  Luis Delisle

The Dominican Republic handball men's team that will compete at the 2015 Pan American Games:

Head coach:  Jose Neninger

The Puerto Rico handball men's team that will compete at the 2015 Pan American Games:

Head coach:  Harold Millan

Uruguay announced their squad on July 6, 2015.

Head coach:  Jorge Botejara

References

Handball at the 2015 Pan American Games
Pan American Games handball squads